Unión Deportiva Mutilvera is a Spanish football team based in Mutilva, Aranguren, in the autonomous community of Navarre. Founded in 1968, it plays in Segunda División RFEF – Group 2.  Its stadium is Estadio Valle Aranguren with a capacity of 2,000 seaters.

History 
The club was founded in 1968 by Juan Contreras after the first meeting with young people from the town Mutilva Baja who had a dream of forming a football team. The club only played youth football until forming a senior team in 1991, playing two seasons as Club Deportivo Indarra before switching to the current name in 1993.

The team was promoted to Segunda División B for the first time ever in 2016 but played there only 1 season and returned to Tercera División.

Season to season

2 seasons in Segunda División B
2 seasons in Segunda División RFEF
17 seasons in Tercera División

Honours
Tercera División: 2017–18

Current squad

See also
:Category:UD Mutilvera players

References

External links
Futbolme team profile  
Profile on Futnavarra.es 
Profile on Ayuntamiento de Aranguren 

Football clubs in Navarre
Association football clubs established in 1968
1968 establishments in Spain